Richard Ofori (born 1 November 1993) is a Ghanaian professional footballer who plays for Orlando Pirates of the South African Premier Division and the Ghana national football team as a goalkeeper.

Club career

Ghana
Ofori spent a number of seasons with Westland FC (a second division club in Accra) before he joined Wa Allstars of Wa, Ghana. He had continuously been linked with moves to South Africa or Europe after his highly praised performances in the Ghanaian Premier League, and went on trial with Cape Town City in late 2016. He was voted best goalkeeper in the 2015 season and was instrumental in the All-Stars' clinching of their first ever title in 2016, again being voted the best goalkeeper.

Maritzburg United
Ofori moved to Premier Soccer League club Maritzburg United on a three-year contract in 2018.

Orlando Pirates 
On 20 October 2020, Ofori signed a three-year contract with Orlando Pirates. He played in the Orlando Pirates matches in the MTN 8 tournament. He started in goal in the final match as the Pirates won the trophy and ended their six-year trophy drought. They beat Bloemfontein Celtic 2–1 to win the trophy.

International career
Ofori played at the 2013 FIFA U-20 World Cup, making one appearance in the third place match, keeping a clean-sheet against Iraq. He later appeared for the Ghana U23, playing at the 2015 African Games.

He was first called up to the senior national team for 2016 African Nations Championship qualification, where he played both legs against the Ivory Coast. He was later called up by head coach Avram Grant for the 2017 Africa Cup of Nations. He is the second deputy captain of the Ghana national football team.

Career statistics

International

Honours
Wa All Stars
 Ghanaian Premier League: 2016
Ghana Super Cup: 2017

Orlando Pirates
 MTN 8: 2020

References

1993 births
Living people
Ghanaian footballers
Ghana international footballers
Association football goalkeepers
Legon Cities FC players
Orlando Pirates F.C. players
Maritzburg United F.C. players
South African Premier Division players
Ghanaian expatriate footballers
Ghanaian expatriate sportspeople in South Africa
Expatriate soccer players in South Africa
2017 Africa Cup of Nations players
2019 Africa Cup of Nations players